The 2021 Maryland Cycling Classic (known as the Maryland Cycling Classic, presented by UnitedHealthcare for sponsorship reasons) was scheduled to be the inaugural edition of the Maryland Cycling Classic road cycling one day race, to be held on September 5, 2021. The category 1.Pro race is a part of the 2021 UCI America Tour and the 2021 UCI ProSeries calendars.

The inaugural edition was originally scheduled for September 6, 2020, but it was postponed to 2021 due to the COVID-19 pandemic. With the Tour of California, the only American UCI World Tour event, on indefinite hiatus, and the Tour of Utah, the only other American UCI ProSeries race, remaining cancelled due to the COVID-19 pandemic, the Maryland Cycling Classic would have been the highest level road cycling race in the United States in 2021.

However, on July 2, 2021, race organizers decided to postpone the race again, with the inaugural edition now expected to take place in 2022.

Teams 

As of the announcement of the cancellation of the race, two UCI WorldTeams, one UCI ProTeam, and seven UCI Continental teams made up the ten teams that would have participated in the race, with race organizers originally expecting to invite six to eight more teams.

UCI WorldTeams

 
 

UCI ProTeams

 

UCI Continental Teams

References

External links 

Maryland Cycling Classic
Maryland Cycling Classic
Maryland Cycling Classic
Maryland Cycling Classic